Barry Brennan (born 20 October 1958) is an Irish former Gaelic footballer who played as a right wing-forward at senior level for the Galway county team. He won an All Star in 1981.

Honours
St Grellan's
 Connacht Senior Club Football Championship (1): 1979
 Galway Senior Club Football Championship (2): 1979, 1980

Galway
 Connacht Senior Football Championship (5): 1982, 1983, 1984, 1986, 1987
 National Football League (1): 1980-81 (c)

References

 

1956 births
Living people
All Stars Awards winners (football)
Gaelic football forwards
Galway inter-county Gaelic footballers
St Grellan's Gaelic footballers